Sachigo Lake Airport  is located  north of the First Nations community of Sachigo Lake, Ontario, Canada.

Because Sachigo Lake First Nation is a "dry" community that forbids alcohol, each arriving passenger has their luggage searched in a separate arrivals building to make sure they are not bringing any contraband in with them.

Airlines and destinations

Accidents and incidents

References

External links

Certified airports in Kenora District